Barnesville is an unincorporated community in Clinton County, in the U.S. state of Missouri.

History
Barnesville was founded in 1857.  A post office called Barnesville was established in 1860, and remained in operation until 1872.

References

Unincorporated communities in Clinton County, Missouri
1857 establishments in Missouri
Unincorporated communities in Missouri